Don Martin (15 February 1944 – 15 November 2009) was an English professional footballer who played for Northampton Town and Blackburn Rovers.

Career
Martin came through the ranks at Northampton Town, although he hardly got into the team during the first few years. However, during the middle part of the 60's, he became a prolific scorer and when the Cobblers were promoted to Division One, he was one of the two joint top scorers. Despite the Cobblers falling back down the divisions Martin continued to score goals and once the club fell into Division Three, Blackburn Rovers stepped in with a bid of £36,000. Martin spent eight years at Blackburn suffering relegation to the Third Division and winning promotion back to the second tier in that time. When Bill Dodgin, Jr. took over at Northampton he brought Martin back to the club. He was a more complete player by now, playing in midfield and defence as well as attack. He left the club in 1978 to play for Hitchin Town and later managed Corby Town as well as setting up a painting and decorating business.

External links
Northampton Town profile
Don Martin Stats

1944 births
2009 deaths
English footballers
Northampton Town F.C. players
Blackburn Rovers F.C. players
Hitchin Town F.C. players
Association football forwards